Eoophyla kingstoni is a moth in the family Crambidae. It was described by David John Lawrence Agassiz in 2012. It is found in Malawi.

The wingspan is 12–13 mm. The forewings are white, with a yellow median fascia and a fuscous dot on the costa. The terminal area is yellow with a white wedge-shaped costal strigula. The base of the hindwings is white with a yellow median fascia edged with fuscous scales.

Etymology
The species is named for Tony Kingston, who collected the species.

References

Eoophyla
Moths described in 2012